The PGA-ASU School of Nursing is a collaboration between Aklan State University and the Provincial Government of Aklan. It was envisioned to provide affordable Nursing education to the people of Aklan by then Governor Carlito Marquez.

See also
 List of schools in Kalibo, Aklan

External links
 Official Website of Aklan Province

Schools
Universities and colleges in Aklan